Troy Rutter (born August 1, 1973) is an American actor, author and programmer. He was born in Ames, Iowa where he attended Ames Senior High School and later Iowa State University where he earned a Bachelor of Arts in Journalism and Mass Communications.

Growing up, he programmed games for the Commodore 64 including "Bash Yer Brains" and "Stat!"  He regularly hosted online chat rooms for the Music Connection, Commodore Software Showcase and Information Network areas on the Commodore BBS QuantumLink.  He also produced several "SID" songs for the Commodore during this time.

In 1992, while attending Iowa State University, he started the first Babylon 5 mailing list on the college's VAX system.  The load on the machine when combined with the alt.tv.Babylon-5 newsgroup later eventually crashed the machine and was disconnected from the newsgroup.  It is because of his involvement with early Babylon 5 fandom that he was offered a job at Warner Bros. Online to produce the Official Babylon 5 Web Site and the area on America Online.   He has also been connected with various Hollywood websites including E.R., Rosie O'Donnell, Drew Carey and Friends. He served as a production assistant on The Apprentice and was a writer on the TV game show Pictionary He is also a  member of the Screen Actors Guild after appearing on the TV show 7th Heaven.

In 2004, he published a book, Kids in the Biz: A Hollywood Handbook for Parents.  He is also a podcaster with a weekly show called Rutter's Ramblings.

On June 18, 2012, Troy started a Kickstarter project to fund his new book called The Journey.  Troy has said that this will be a self-published book to be released on Amazon.

Troy has also published a book in 2016 entitled "Autograph Collecting Secrets: Tools and Tactics for Through-The-Mail, In-Person and Convention Success" and is an active member of the TTM (through the mail) autograph collective community.

He currently resides in Ames, Iowa.

Books
Kids in the Biz: A Hollywood Handbook for Parents, 2004

References

External links
 TroyRutter.com (personal website)
 Rutters Ramblings (podcast site)
 
 Replayer.com (SID Music)

1973 births
Living people
People from Ames, Iowa
American bloggers
American podcasters
21st-century American non-fiction writers